A long range pseudoknot is a pseudoknot containing a long loop region, and may be a mechanism of translational control.

A long range pseudoknot is thought to negatively regulate the translation of the IF3-L35-L20 operon in E. coli. This operon encodes the translation initiation factor IF-3 and ribosomal proteins L35 and L20. In this example, the RNA-RNA interaction occurs between nucleotides separated by a 300 nucleotide loop region.

A long range pseudoknot is also believed to be required for the activity of the Neurospora VS ribozyme.

References

External links 
Rfam entry for Long range pseudoknots

Non-coding RNA